Verde Island is a volcanic island situated along the bodies of Verde Island Passage between the islands of Luzon and Mindoro, Philippines. It was in 1988 when a small village was connected to mains electricity through the effort of a European project using technologies such as solar panels for the island's self-sufficiency. Since then, it has been declared by the Philippine Tourism Authority as one of the country's marine reserves.

Geography 

Verde Island lies south of Brgy. Ilijan, Batangas City and is separated from Luzon by the North Pass. It takes 1 hour and 30 minutes by a boat or 25 minutes by a ferry boat from Batangas City Port to reach the island.

Famous destinations in the island include:
Mahabang Buhangin, a kilometer-long stretch of white sand beach.
Cueva Sitio, a cave that leads to the other side of the island.

Verde Island has been a destination for tourists and divers in Batangas City since 1999, after the Pastor clan opened an P80 Million resort at Brgy. San Antonio.

See also 
 Verde Island Passage
 Batangas Bay

Footnotes

References

External links 
 
 
 Official Website of the Local Government of Batangas City

Islands of Batangas
Beaches of the Philippines
Batangas City